Xəlilli (also, Khalikhli and Khalilli) is a village and municipality in the Davachi Rayon of Azerbaijan.  It has a population of 433.  The municipality consists of the villages of Xələlli, Liman, and Sarvan.

References 

Populated places in Shabran District